Chrysodeixis chrysopepla is a moth of the family Noctuidae.

External links
Chrysodeixis at funet

Plusiinae
Moths described in 1989